The 2018 Volta Limburg Classic was the 45th edition of the Volta Limburg Classic cycle race and was held on 31 March 2018. The race started and finished in Eijsden. The race was won by Jan Tratnik.

Teams
Twenty-four teams were invited to take part in the race. These included one UCI WorldTour team, nine UCI Professional Continental teams and fourteen UCI Continental teams.

UCI WorldTour Teams

 

UCI Professional Continental Teams

 
 
 
 
 
 
 
 
 

UCI Continental Teams

 Alecto Cycling Team
 
 
 
 
 
 Lotto–Kern Haus
 
 Monkey Town Continental Team
 
 
 
 
 Vlasman Track/Road Continental Cycling Team

Results

References

2018
2018 UCI Europe Tour
2018 in Dutch sport